America 2040 (1986-1988) is a science fiction book series by Evan Innes, a pen name for Hugh Zachary. 

Locked in a fierce struggle with the Soviets and on the brink of nuclear annihilation, the United States sends a courageous group of men and women on a mission into the uncharted realms of outer space.

Summaries

America 2040

Dexter Hamilton was born in North Carolina in 1987. He became governor, senator and the President of the United States in 2033. He is the first American President to travel to the Soviet Union to meet the Soviet Premier Yuri Kolchak to talk over weapons of war along with his Secretary of State, George Maxwell. These two men are accompanied by Soviet General Theresa Pulaski. Hamilton and Maxwell go back to Washington DC to figure out what happened in the Soviet Union during their summit meeting. They decide to use Project Lightstep and rhenium fuel for ships heading to space in the near future.

Eight years later in 2040, the shuttle known as Spirit of America is preparing to launch to find the new frontier. Shuttle commander Duncan Rodrick along with his crew Jackie Garvey, Rocky Miller and his wife Mandy along with Pat Renfro, Jack Purdy and his wife Dinah are heading for the frontier while the Clay Girard and his dog, Jumper, want to be part of this until their deaths.

America 2040: The Golden World 

The second chapter begins after the Spirit of America's journey, with three crew members killed, namely Dick Stanton, Dinah Purdy and Pat Renfro. Eventually they find a new planet, Omega that is similar to Earth. They settle on the new planet and name various geographical features after the dead crew members, such as Stanton Bay, Lake Dinah and Renfro Mountains.

America 2040: City In The Mist 

The third chapter continues as the citizens of the planet Omega are safe and sound while captain Duncan Rodrick and his crew find a new city of stone that was discovered by Stoner McRae until Hamilton decided to visit the new planet for the first time since he became the commander in chief.

America 2040: The Return 

The fourth chapter continues as Omega citizens welcome Hamilton to the new planet after his new ship, Free Enterprise, lands.

America 2040: The Star Explorer 

The fifth and final chapter of the America 2040 series comes as the planet Omega citizens elect Hamilton as the president of Omega.

Reception
Publishers Weekly called the first novel in the series "a kind of neoconservative pulp novel, overbearing and sodden".

References

1986 American novels
American science fiction novels